Poly(A) binding protein cytoplasmic 5 is a protein that in humans is encoded by the PABPC5 gene.

Function

This gene encodes a poly(A)-binding protein that binds to the polyA tail found at the 3' end of most eukaryotic mRNAs. It is thought to play a role in the regulation of mRNA metabolic processes in the cytoplasm. This gene is located in a gene-poor region within the X-specific 13d-sY43 subinterval of the chromosome Xq21.3/Yp11.2 homology block. It is located close to translocation breakpoints associated with premature ovarian failure, and is therefore a potential candidate gene for this disorder. [provided by RefSeq, May 2010].

References

Further reading 

Proteins